The Los Angeles County Department of Mental Health (LACDMH or DMH), is the largest county mental health department in the United States and provides mental health services for Los Angeles County residents. DMH directly operates 75 program sites in the county and serves over 250,000 clients annually. DMH's headquarters is located on Vermont Avenue in Koreatown, Los Angeles, California.

List of LACDMH directors
1978-1984  Dr. John Richard "J.R." Elpers, Psy.D
1984-1992  Roberto Quiroz, MSW
1992-1998  Dr. Areta Crowell, Psy.D
1998-2016  Dr. Marvin Southard, DSW
2016-present  Dr. Jonathan E. Sherin, M.D., Ph.D.

References

External links

Department of Mental Health
Department of Health Services

Government of Los Angeles County, California
County government agencies in California
Health departments in California
Government agencies established in 1978